Willets may refer to:

People 
William Willets Cocks (1861–1932), American politician from New York
Willets Outerbridge, sailor from the United States, who represented his country at the 1928 Summer Olympics in Amsterdam, Netherlands
David Willets or David Willetts (born 1956), English Conservative Party politician
Karl Willets of Bolt Thrower, a British death metal band from Coventry, England
Anita Willets-Burnham, American Impressionist artist, teacher at the School of the Art Institute of Chicago, author, and lecturer

Places 
Willets, New York, in the Town of Ledyard
Willets, North Carolina, unincorporated community in Jackson County, North Carolina, United States
Willets Point, Queens, known locally as the Iron Triangle, an industrial neighborhood within Corona in the New York City borough of Queens

See also
Willet
Willetts
Willet's Department Store (defunct), Colton, California